(APG) is a scientific journal of plant taxonomy and botany published by the  (formerly by the Societas Phytogeographica of Kyoto). The journal was established along with the Societas Phytogeographica in 1932 by Gen-ichi Koidzumi. According to the International Plant Names Index, over 3,300 plant names have been first published in the journal.

See also
 Journal of Japanese Botany
 Journal of Plant Research (formerly The Botanical Magazine (Tokyo))

References

External links

Botany journals
Academic journals of Japan